Some Days You Eat the Bear and Some Days the Bear Eats You is the 1974 album by country rock/folk rock musician Ian Matthews.

The original vinyl album was released worldwide by Elektra Records, the second of two Ian Matthews solo albums released on that label (the first being Valley Hi in 1973), and featured various well-known session musicians such as David Lindley, Al Garth, Jeff Baxter from Steely Dan, and others. It also featured bandmates, guitarist Andy Roberts and drummer Timi Donald, from the first Plainsong album, In Search of Amelia Earhart.

The album was reissued on CD by Elektra in 1991 and has twice been reissued as a 2-on-1 remastered release with Valley Hi, first by Water Records in 2003, and more recently by BGO Records in 2017.

Track listing
"Ol' '55"  (Tom Waits) - 3:12
"I Don't Wanna Talk About It"  (Danny Whitten) - 3:48
"A Wailing Goodbye"  (Ian Matthews) - 2:52
"Keep On Sailing"  (Ian Matthews) - 4:37
"Tried So Hard"  (Gene Clark) - 3:00
"Dirty Work"  (Donald Fagen, Walter Becker) - 2:51
"Do I Still Figure In Your Life"  (Pete Dello) - 2:51
"Home"  (Ian Matthews) - 3:12
"Biloxi"  (Jesse Winchester) - 4:18
"The Fault"  (Ian Matthews) - 3:00

Personnel
Ian Matthews - acoustic guitar, vocals
Jeff "Skunk" Baxter - electric, acoustic and pedal steel guitar
David Lindley - lap steel guitar 
B. J. Cole - pedal steel guitar
David Barry - organ, piano, keyboards
Andy Roberts - acoustic guitar
Joel Tepp - acoustic guitar, harmonica
Michael Fonfara - piano, keyboards
Lynn Dobson - alto saxophone
Al Garth - alto saxophone
Jay Lacy - electric guitar
Willie Leacox - drums
Danny Lane - drums on "Tried So Hard"
Timi Donald - drums on "Keep On Sailing"
Danny Weis - electric and acoustic guitar
Steve Gillette - acoustic guitar
David Dickey - bass
Billy Graham - bass on "Tried So Hard"
Bob Warford - electric guitar on "Tried So Hard"

Production
Producer: Ian Matthews
Recording Engineer: Fritz Richmond at Elektra Sound Recorders, Hollywood CA
Album Design: Brian D McLaughlin with assistance from Ian and Christina Matthews
Photography/Cover Art: Front and back cover: Brian D McLaughlin; Insert: Christina Matthews
Liner Notes: Linda Hennrick

References

Iain Matthews albums
1974 albums
Elektra Records albums